Kenneth Harold Bowden (July 11, 1930 – March 5, 2017) was an American-born British journalist and golf writer. He is most known as a longtime collaborator to Jack Nicklaus on twelve of his books, including Golf My Way.

External links
 Obituary

 Golf Digest

 IMDB Page

Golf writers and broadcasters

1930 births

2017 deaths